Immortal Legacy is the fifth studio album by American thrash metal band Hirax, released on February 24, 2014. It is the first album since the 1980s to feature a four-piece band. It is also the last with Jorge Iacobellis on drums.

A music video was made for the song "Hellion Rising".

Track listing

Personnel
Katon W. de Pena (Bobby Johnson) - vocals
Lance Harrison - guitars
Steve Harrison - bass
Jorge Iacobellis - drums

Additional musicians
 Juan Garcia - guitars on "Hellion Rising"
 Jim Durkin - guitars
 Rocky George - guitars
 Fabricio Ravelli - drums

Production
 Rafael Mattey - design, layout
 Phil Lawvere - cover art
 Bill Metoyer - recording, mixing, mastering, production

References 

2014 albums
Hirax albums
SPV/Steamhammer albums